Friss Újság (Fresh Newspaper) is a Romanian daily newspaper, issued in Hungarian language by the Inform Media company and focused mainly on politics, public affairs, sports and economy. The first edition was printed in 1990.

References

External links
 

Newspapers published in Satu Mare
Publications established in 1990
Hungarian-language newspapers